Ambulyx interplacida is a species of moth of the family Sphingidae first described by Ronald Brechlin in 2006. It is known from the south-eastern Chinese provinces of Jiangxi and Hunan.

The wingspan is 112–120 mm. It is similar to Ambulyx semiplacida, but there is no violet tinge on the forewing upperside and the wing undersides are more reddish. There are also distinct differences in the male genitalia.

References

Ambulyx
Moths described in 2006
Moths of Asia